State Route 197 (SR-197) was a state highway in the U.S. state of Utah. Also known as 500 West, it spanned  in the city of Lehi, connecting Main Street and State Street.

Route description
State Route 197 started at the intersection of Main Street (SR-73) and 500 West in the city of Lehi. From here, it traveled north along 500 West through primarily suburban and rural neighborhoods, crossing the tracks for the FrontRunner commuter rail, and ending at its intersection with State Street (US-89) approximately  later.

History
State Route 197 was designated in 1935, as running from Route 1 (now US-89) in Lehi south for one mile. It was extended in 1943 to run to what was then numbered SR-68 (renumbered as SR-73 since then). The route remained unchanged until 2011, when it was deleted from the state highway system.

Major intersections

References

197
 197
Lehi, Utah
Streets in Utah